Kelley Aitken is a Canadian writer, visual artist, and art instructor.

Aitken was born in Vancouver, British Columbia, and graduated from the University of Guelph with a degree in Fine Arts. Her first book, a collection of short stories entitled Love in a Warm Climate (1998), was short-listed for the 1999 Commonwealth Writers' Prize Best First Book Prize . Aitken co-edited, and contributed to, First Writes an anthology published in 2005.

Aitken lives in Toronto, Ontario.

Bibliography
Love in a Warm Climate. Erin, Ontario: Porcupine's Quill, 1998.
First Writes. Banff, Alberta: Banff Centre, 2005. (edited with Susan Goyette and Barbara Scott)

Living people
Canadian women short story writers
Writers from Vancouver
20th-century Canadian short story writers
21st-century Canadian short story writers
21st-century Canadian women writers
20th-century Canadian women writers
Year of birth missing (living people)